Lavenia Tinai (born September 7, 1990) is a Fijian rugby union player. She represents Fiji in rugby sevens and made her debut in 2012. She was selected to represent Fiji at the 2016 Summer Olympics as a member of the Fiji women's sevens team. She is the sister of former Fiji 7's rep, Ilai Tinai.

Tinai competed for Fiji in rugby sevens at the 2020 Summer Olympics and won a bronze medal at the event. She was part of the Fijiana sevens team that won the silver medal at the 2022 Commonwealth Games in Birmingham. She later competed at the Rugby World Cup Sevens in Cape Town.

References

External links

 

1990 births
Rugby sevens players at the 2016 Summer Olympics
Olympic rugby sevens players of Fiji
Fiji international rugby sevens players
Fijian female rugby union players
Living people
Rugby sevens players at the 2020 Summer Olympics
Medalists at the 2020 Summer Olympics
Olympic bronze medalists for Fiji
Olympic medalists in rugby sevens
Fiji international women's rugby sevens players
Commonwealth Games silver medallists for Fiji
Commonwealth Games medallists in rugby sevens
Rugby sevens players at the 2022 Commonwealth Games
Medallists at the 2022 Commonwealth Games